Senator Hartley may refer to:

Joan Hartley (fl. 1980s–2010s),  Connecticut State Senate
Mary Hartley (born 1954), Arizona State Senate